The Yugoslav People's Army ranks are the military insignia used by the Yugoslav People's Army.

Ranks (1945–1946)

Officers
The rank insignia for commissioned officers for the Army respectively.

Enlisted
The rank insignia for enlisted personnel for the Army respectively.

Ranks (1946–1955)

Officers
The following are the rank insignia for commissioned officers for the Ground forces, Navy and Air force respectively.

Enlisted
The rank insignia for enlisted personnel for the Ground forces, Navy and Air force respectively.

Ranks (1955–1982)
This table shows the rank structure in use by Yugoslav People's Army from 1955 to 1982.

Officers
The rank insignia for commissioned officers for the Ground forces, Navy and Air force respectively.

Enlisted
The rank insignia for enlisted personnel for the Ground forces, Navy and Air force respectively.

Ranks (1982–1992)

Officers
The rank insignia of commissioned officers.

Enlisted
The rank insignia for enlisted personnel for the Ground forces, Navy and Air force respectively.

See also
Military ranks and insignia of Bosnia and Herzegovina
Croatian military ranks
Military ranks of Serbia
Ranks and insignia of the Armed Forces of Serbia and Montenegro

Notes

References

External links